Stuart Goetz is a Daytime Emmy Award winning film music editor best known for his music editing roles on The West Wing, The Vampire Diaries and Pretty Little Liars, among others.  

Prior to his music editing career, Goetz was a stage actor, appearing on Broadway in the musicals Mame, Oliver!, and Ben Franklin in Paris throughout the mid to late-1960s. Making the transition to television in the early-1970s, Goetz is perhaps most known for his role as "Charlie" in the 1973 The Brady Bunch episode, "The Subject Was Noses" (the infamous "oh, my nose!" episode, in which Marcia is struck on the nose with a football).  In 1976, Goetz recorded a single for Curb Records, "(I'm a Song) Sing Me," which was co-written by Neil Sedaka.

His best-known film role was in the drive-in movie, The Van, starring alongside Danny DeVito.  Goetz played the lead role of Bobby, a teenager who buys a customized 1976 Dodge van with his college savings so he can use it to pick up women.

Filmography (As Music Editor)

Selected Filmography (As Actor)
The Van (1977)
Record City (1978)

Appearances on TV shows
"Who's Afraid of Mother Goose?" on Off to See the Wizard
The Brady Bunch
The Paul Lynde Show
The Partridge Family
Flipper
It's a Bird…It's a Plane…It's Superman (musical)
Ring Raiders

References

External links

American male actors
Living people
Place of birth missing (living people)
Year of birth missing (living people)